The  is a wheeled armored fighting vehicle of the Japan Ground Self-Defense Force.

The Type 16 maneuver combat vehicle (MCV) equips designated combat units.  Due to its light weight and small size, it is designed for easy deployment (by aircraft if needed) allowing rapid movement on narrow roads and in built-up areas in response to various contingencies. Despite its small size and light armor, it can successfully attack much larger armored fighting vehicles as well as personnel, using its large caliber gun.

Design
MCVs are expected to be highly functional, but can also be loaded on Kawasaki C-2 at the same time. JPSDF is dedicated to securing transport vessels for maritime transport independently, and will be carried on these vessels and transported to the Okinawa Islands.

The main gun is manually loaded as a cost-saving measure.  Some critics have expressed doubts about its effectiveness due to this strain on the crew in hot conditions, as the vehicle does not have air conditioning. 

In 2009, resistance testing of the shielding against HEAT rounds was conducted using the Carl Gustav M2; and against regular kinetic ammunition the frontal shield was developed to resist shots from 20 mm to 30 mm autocannons while the side armor was deemed sufficient to resist 14.5 mm heavy machine gun fire.

History

The first concept for a Japanese wheeled chassis mounting a 105 mm cannon appeared with the "Future Combat Vehicle" (将来装輪戦闘車両) program in 2003. The program was centered around a universal wheeled chassis mounting a variety of weaponry including a 40 mm CTA cannon, 120 mm mortar system, 155 mm howitzer, and most notably a 105 mm cannon. The Future Combat Vehicle program was cancelled due to development expenses, but the concept for a 105 mm cannon would be expanded upon in the Light Combat Vehicle Program.

The LCV program was a technology demonstration to explore the viability of multiple concepts that would possibly be integrated into the Maneuver Combat Vehicle development. These include IED and mine resistance, individual motors inside of the wheels, air transportability inside of a C-2 and C-130, passive hydro-pneumatic suspension to reduce recoil and a double action low recoil cannon that could provide indirect and direct fire. Initial designs for the LCV called for a 6x6 design, but that concept was scrapped in favor of an 8x8 design for the MCV. Other concepts that would be omitted from the Type 16 include the in-wheel engines, transport inside of the C-130, and indirect fire capability of the main cannon. The IED/ anti-tank mine resistance became an optional plate for the undercarriage that Type 16 crews can special order for their vehicle. After the concept was confirmed to be viable, work began on creating a new vehicle that would incorporate what was learned from the LCV project.

The Technical Research & Development Institute of Japan's Ministry of Defense had made several prototype vehicles since 2008.  They unveiled their fourth of what were initially called "mobile combat vehicle" prototypes on 9 October 2013. JGSDF service Acceptance tests were scheduled to begin in 2014 or 2015, with initial operational deployment by the JGSDF planned for 2016. 99 MCVs were originally planned to be introduced by the end of FY 2018. The name of the vehicle was changed to maneuver combat vehicle during the second half of 2011.

For FY2016, the MOD has requested funding for 36 examples of the MCV, to enter service with elements of the 8th Division at Kumamoto, and the 14th Brigade at Zentsūji. Both formations are currently planned for conversion to rapid reaction forces (though these plans, as with the original plans for the MCV [see History], are presently (mid-2015) under review and subject to possible major revision). The intention is for the MCV to act as both as a rapid reaction asset against conventional incursions on the outer islands and as a counter-insurgency vehicle against asymmetrical attacks in urban areas of Japan by enemy special forces, intelligence operatives, or their proxies.

The MCV was part of a new armored vehicle strategy that prioritized light air-transportable firepower. Originally the number of main battle tanks was to be reduced from 760 to 390, with most remaining tanks to be concentrated on the main Japanese islands of Hokkaido and Kyushu. Some 200–300 MCVs were to be procured and these would be airlifted to islands when and where they were needed.  The idea was that the smaller, lighter, and faster MCV could be redeployed quicker than tanks to better defend the outlying islands. This represented a shift in Japanese armored vehicle structure from one designed to repel a Soviet invasion from the north to a more mobile force aimed at possibly defending against a Chinese invasion of the southern island chain. 

The MCV was intended to help re-equip existing divisions and brigades reorganised into mobile (rapid reaction) divisions/brigades, as well as equip new dedicated rapid reaction regiments alongside (eventually) the Light-weight Combat Vehicle System (LCV) which was also designed with defense of the outer islands in mind.

On March 15, 2023, ATLA announced that 250 MCVs will be brought to JGSDF service.

Operators 

 Japan Ground Self-Defense Force
  Northern Army
  11th Brigade
 10th Rapid Deployment Regiment
  2nd Division
 3rd Rapid Deployment Regiment
 North Eastern Army
  6th Division
 22nd Rapid Deployment Regiment
  Eastern Army
  1st Division
 1st Reconnaissance Combat Battalion
  Central Army
  14th Brigade
 15th Rapid Deployment Regiment
  Western Army
  4th Division
 4th Reconnaissance Combat Battalion
  8th Division
 42nd Rapid Deployment Regiment
  JGSDF Fuji School
 JGSDF Fuji School (Combined Training) Brigade
 Armored (Advanced) Training Unit

Notes

References

External links
 
 JGSDF – 105mm 8X8 Maneuver Combat Vehicle (MCV) Testing A short YouTube video from 2013

Armoured cars of Japan
Tank destroyers
Counterinsurgency
Fire support vehicles
Post–Cold War military equipment of Japan
Mitsubishi Heavy Industries armored vehicles
Eight-wheeled vehicles
Military vehicles introduced in the 2000s